Eiler Holm (2 April 1904 - 6 April 1987) was a Danish amateur footballer who spent his entire club career with Boldklubben Frem. Holm, who worked as a butcher on the side, was known as a talented and robust but not very hard-working player.

Honours
Danish champion: 1922–23, 1930–31 and 1932–33 with Frem

References

External links
Danish national team profile

1904 births
1965 deaths
Danish men's footballers
Denmark international footballers
Boldklubben Frem players
Association football defenders
Footballers from Copenhagen